Solomon Run is a stream in the U.S. state of Ohio.

Solomon Run was named for Solomon Claypool, an early settler.

See also
List of rivers of Ohio

References

Rivers of Brown County, Ohio
Rivers of Highland County, Ohio
Rivers of Ohio